The election of the President of India is an indirect election in which  electoral college consisting of the elected members of both houses of parliament (M.P.s), the elected members of the State Legislative Assemblies (Vidhan Sabha) of all States and the elected members of the legislative assemblies (MLAs) of union territories with legislatures, i.e., National Capital Territory (NCT) of Delhi, Jammu and Kashmir, and Puducherry. The election process of the president is a more extensive process than of the prime minister who is also elected indirectly (not elected by people directly) by the Lok Sabha members only. Whereas President being the constitutional head with duties to protect, defend and preserve the constitution and rule of law in a constitutional democracy with constitutional supremacy, is elected in an extensive manner by the members of Lok Sabha, Rajya Sabha and state legislative assemblies in a secret ballot procedure.

Electoral college results

See also
 Elections in India
 Electoral College
 List of Indian vice presidential elections
 List of Rajya Sabha elections
 List of Indian general elections
 List of Indian state legislative assembly elections

References

External links
 Presidential Elections
 President of India
 Former Presidents of India

India
Elections in India
Presidential elections in India
India politics-related lists